Salentia is a genus of flies belonging to the family Therevidae.

The species of this genus are found in Spain and Portugal.

Species:

Salentia anancitis 
Salentia asiatica 
Salentia costalis 
Salentia deserticola 
Salentia fuscipennis 
Salentia margiana 
Salentia mongolica 
Salentia nigripes 
Salentia stackelbergi 
Salentia tristis 
Salentia xestomyzina

References

Therevidae